Citrus leaf rugose virus (CLRV) is a plant pathogenic virus of the family Bromoviridae. It infects a wide range of valuable citrus hosts (Mexican lime, Eureka lemon, and Duncan grapefruit, for example) and while its specific vector is unknown, it can be mechanically transmitted to non-citrus hosts.

References

External links
 ICTVdB - The Universal Virus Database: Citrus leaf rugose virus
 Family Groups - The Baltimore Method

Viral citrus diseases
Bromoviridae